Chris Kiffin (born January 19, 1982) is an American football coach who is the linebackers coach for the Houston Texans of the National Football League (NFL).  He previously served as an assistant coach for the Cleveland Browns, San Francisco 49ers and Tampa Bay Buccaneers. He also coached at Florida Atlantic, Ole Miss, Arkansas State, USC, Nebraska and Idaho.

Coaching career

Idaho
In 2005, Kiffin started his coaching career at Idaho as a coaching assistant.

In 2006, Kiffin was hired by the Tampa Bay Buccaneers as a offseason quality control intern under head coach Jon Gruden.

Nebraska
In 2008, Kiffin was hired as a defensive quality control coach at Nebraska.

USC
In 2010, Kiffin was hired as a defensive assistant at USC.

Arkansas State
In 2011, Kiffin was hired as a defensive line coach at Arkansas State.

Ole Miss
In 2012, Kiffin was hired as a defensive line coach at Ole Miss. He left in 2017 to join his brother.

Florida Atlantic
In 2017, Kiffin was hired by his brother, Lane Kiffin, at Florida Atlantic as a defensive coordinator in 2016.

San Francisco 49ers
In 2018, Kiffin was hired by the San Francisco 49ers as their pass rush specialist coach under head coach Kyle Shanahan.

Cleveland Browns
On February 13, 2020, Kiffin was hired by the Cleveland Browns as their defensive line coach under head coach Kevin Stefanski. Following the 2021 season, Kiffin left the Browns coaching staff to join the coaching staff at Ole Miss. However, on February 10, 2022, Kiffin left Ole Miss to return to the Browns and take his former coaching role.

Houston Texans
On February 14, 2023, Kiffin left the Cleveland Browns to become the linebackers coach with the Houston Texans.

Personal life
Chris is the son of longtime National Football League defensive coordinator Monte Kiffin and the younger brother of the University of Mississippi (Ole Miss) head coach Lane Kiffin Chris and his wife, Angela, have four children: daughters, Bella, Grace and Taylor, and son, Christian. A native of Tampa, Florida, Chris played defensive tackle at Colorado State.

References

Living people
1982 births
American football defensive linemen
Arkansas State Red Wolves football coaches
Cleveland Browns coaches
Colorado State Rams football players
Florida Atlantic Owls football coaches
Idaho Vandals football coaches
Nebraska Cornhuskers football coaches
Ole Miss Rebels football coaches
San Francisco 49ers coaches
Tampa Bay Buccaneers coaches
USC Trojans football coaches